Ultimate Space Rock is a various artists compilation album released on June 8, 1999 by Cleopatra Records.

Reception

AllMusic gave the collection a rating of one and a half out of five possible stars and said "as a comprehensive document of this underground genre, Ultimate Space Rock'''s title says it all."

 Track listing 

Personnel
Adapted from the Ultimate Space Rock'' liner notes.

 Tom Grimley – engineering
 Len del Rio – production

Release history

References 

1999 compilation albums
Cleopatra Records compilation albums